Lamoral of Taxis (1557 - 7 July 1624, Brussels) was an official in the Spanish Netherlands. He was the son of the general postmaster Leonard I of Taxis (1522, Mechelen – 1612, Brussels). In 1579 he married Genoveva von Taxis, daughter of the Augsburg postmaster Seraphin II. von Taxis. In 1606 he and his father were appointed imperial officials and on 16 January 1608 Freiherr. On 27 July 1615 he became hereditary general postmaster and on 8 June 1624 - a month before his death - an imperial count. He is also known as Lamoral I to distinguish him from his nephew Lamoral Claudius Franz von Thurn und Taxis.

References

External links
Rübsam: Taxis, Lamoral Graf von. In: Allgemeine Deutsche Biographie (ADB). Band 37, Duncker & Humblot, Leipzig 1894, S. 508 f.

1557 births
1624 deaths
Lamoral
People from Brussels
People of the Spanish Netherlands
Postmasters-General